Face to Face is a 2000 play by Australian playwright David Williamson. It is part of the Jack Manning Trilogy (Face to Face (2000), A Conversation (2001), Charitable Intent (2001)) which take as their format community conferencing, a new form of restorative justice which Wiliamson became interested in the late 1990s and early 2000s.When Glen, a young construction worker, rams into the back of his boss's Mercedes in a fit of anger at being sacked, he is given the opportunity to discuss his actions in a community conference, rather than going straight to court.

Community conferencing - an alternative method of justice recently introduced to Australia - is explored by Williamson in this engaging and heartfelt play which celebrates the strength of community over our rigid and often seemingly unfair court system.

Characters
JACK MANNING: community conference convener, has interviewed each one of the characters individually before the play and has a fairly good idea about what has transpired before the play begins. He tries to steer the conversations over the issue and attempts to bring it to a happy conclusion, The playwright David Williamson described him as intelligent, discerning, skilled and experienced. Throughout the play Jack keeps a calm demeanor and tries to direct the flow of conversation. His character was used to illustrate the non-tyrannical and democratic process in the conference, he plays the role of a commentator rather than facilitator, he paraphrases and makes suggestions to participators. He is married and has four kids.

GLEN TRAGASKIS: Described as in his mid twenties, he assaulted his boss after being fired, although it is not described it is clear that he is mentally handicapped in some way. In the conference we find out that he constantly boasts about women he knows, when in reality he just wants to appear better to his mates. His being fired was as a result of being pranked upon by friends and coworkers, they told him first of all that his bosses PA Julie was interested in him and then Therese, after he realised he was being fooled, Glen sought out the coworkers responsible. He met and assaulted his foreman Richard even though Richard only knew of the problems without being responsible. It was shortly after this that Glen's boss Greg fired him and then Glen rams into the back of his boss's Mercedes in a fit of anger at being sacked. It becomes unearthed that Glen was physically abused by his father who eventually killed himself after a conversation. Glen is very childish, gullible and described as dangerous when angry.

MAUREEN TRAGASKIS: Glen's mother, in her early 1940s. Cares for her son, and appears to be a little passive, nearly all of the characters appear to have some respect for her and she is discovered to have had an affair with Glen's boss Greg. Very critical of Glen's workmates.

GREG BALDONI: Early 1950s Glen's boss

Film adaptation
This play was adapted into a film  Face to Face (2011), directed by Michael Rymer.

References

Plays by David Williamson
2000 plays
Australian plays adapted into films